"Don't Let Me Down" is a song recorded by British singer-songwriter Leona Lewis for her second studio album Echo (2009). Lewis co-wrote the song with Mike Elizondo, James Fauntleroy, Justin Timberlake and Robin Tadross. It was produced by The Y's and co-produced by Elizondo. Lewis and Timberlake carried out the vocal production. Having wanted to work with Timberlake for a long time, the collaboration came to be after he had asked Lewis to perform at a charity concert he was holding in Las Vegas in October 2008. It was reported that they were going to cover Dolly Parton's song "I Will Always Love You" as a duet, however they worked together on new songs for Echo instead, and "Don't Let Me Down" was created. Lewis revealed that her cover of "Run" inspired Timberlake.

Lyrically, the song is about making difficult decisions in life and trying to take control of situations. The song garnered a mixed response from music critics. While Lewis' vocal performance relieved unanimous praise, some felt that the track lacked any soul or emotion. Its production received comparisons to Timberlake's songs "Cry Me a River" and "What Goes Around... Comes Around". Lewis has performed the song at Rock in Rio and it was included on her debut concert tour, The Labyrinth, and later on the accompanying DVD release, The Labyrinth Tour: Live from the O2.

Background and development

Prior to creating "Don't Let Me Down" for Lewis' second studio album Echo, Justin Timberlake had asked the singer to perform at a charity concert that he was hosting in Las Vegas in October 2008. The singers got to know each other and became friends, resulting in Timberlake asking Lewis to join him in the recording studio to work on some material, which she accepted. In January 2009, it was reported that the pair were planning to cover Dolly Parton's song "I Will Always Love You" as a duet, and were going to record it sometime within the next couple of months when they both had some spare time in their busy schedules. In June 2009, Lewis confirmed that she was over halfway through the recording process for Echo in an interview with Digital Spy, and that she and Timberlake had collaborated on several tracks together. She said that Timberlake was "awesomely talented", and that he had contributed vocals on a couple of the songs.

In a November 2009 interview, Lewis said that she had always wanted to work with Timberlake. In February 2010, she said that a few weeks after the two of them had met in Las Vegas, they went into a recording studio, where Lewis played him her cover of "Run". She revealed that Timberlake was "really inspired" after hearing "Run", and they created "Don't Let Me Down" shortly afterward. She characterised her time in the studio with him as "amazing" and Timberlake as "really hardworking and focused". Lewis said that her favourite song by him is "Cry Me a River", which critics later compared to "Don't Let Me Down" upon the release of Echo.

Internet leak
In August 2009, computer hackers leaked "Don't Let Me Down" on the internet. Record label SyCo and music trade body IFPI called in the police to help them find the hackers. Jeremy Banks, head of IFPI's Internet Anti-Piracy Unit, spoke about the situation in an interview for The Sun, saying "IFPI is working with SyCo and law enforcement agencies in the US and Europe to trace the individuals who stole the Leona Lewis/Justin Timberlake track". He clarified that the investigation was ongoing and stated that such pre-release leaks are damaging for the members who invest budgets in marketing and promotion before release. The Sun reported that SyCo's personal computers were also hacked the previous month and unfinished tracks by singer Alexandra Burke were also leaked. SyCo also expressed their opinion, stating that they believe the song was leaked by hackers and not by someone in the music industry. A representative for the BBC confirmed that the record label's personal computers had been under "sustained attack" for some time and said "We will certainly look to bring charges against those who are responsible."

Recording and composition

"Don't Let Me Down" was co-written by Lewis with Mike Elizondo, James Fauntleroy, Timberlake and Robin Tadross. Production of the song was done by The Y's, while Elizondo served as the co-producer. Lewis and Timberlake carried out the vocal production. The track was recorded by Paul Folley at Henson Studios and was mixed by Jean-Marie Harvat at East West Studios, both of which are located in Los Angeles, California. Harvat was assisted in the mixing process by Mimi Parker. Larry Gold was enlisted as the string arranger. Timberlake also contributes uncredited background vocals. It was composed in the key of E Major using common time at 60 beats per minute. Instrumentation consists of a piano, guitar, strings, and "subtle" percussion. The style in which "Don't Let Me Down" was produced received comparisons to song recorded by Timberlake, including "Cry Me a River" and "What Goes Around... Comes Around". According to Michael Cragg of musicOMH, Lewis is singing about "making tough decisions and trying to take back control".

Reception and live performances

Cragg wrote that "Don't Let Me Down" and another Echo track "I Got You" are "equally infectious"; he also praised Lewis' vocal performance and described it as "genuinely stirring". Nick Levine for Digital Spy was brief in his description of the song, simply calling it "lovely". BBC Music's Mike Diver wrote that although the track resembles Timberlake's songs "Cry Me a River" and "What Goes Around... Comes Around", Lewis fails to deliver "Don't Let Me Down" with "any comparable soulfulness." As part of his review of Echo, Matthew Cole for Slant Magazine wrote that too much of the album is dominated by "thoughtless" ballads like "Stop Crying Your Heart Out" and "Don't Let Me Down". While he noted that Lewis gives a "technically unimpeachable" vocal performance, he wrote that it does not compensate for the "dull arrangement" and lack of emotion in her delivery.

Lewis performed "Don't Let Me Down" at the Rock in Rio festival held in Lisbon on 22 May 2010. The song was included as the second song on the set list of her debut concert tour, called The Labyrinth (2010). It was later included on the DVD release of the tour, The Labyrinth Tour: Live from the O2. Lewis performed the song in the first section of the set list, along with "Brave" as the opener, "Better in Time", "Whatever It Takes" and "Take a Bow". Jade Wright for the Liverpool Echo wrote that the singer belted out the track. The set was decorated in the style of a castle; acrobats performed as they were hanging from the ceiling on large pieces of fabric while Lewis wore a gold sequined dress and thigh high boots.

Track listings
Echo standard edition

Echo United States standard version

The Labyrinth Tour: Live from the O2

Credits and personnel
Recording
Recorded at Henson Studios, Los Angeles, CA.
Mixed at East West Studios, Los Angeles, CA.

Personnel
Songwriting – Mike Elizondo, James Fauntleroy, Leona Lewis, Justin Timberlake, Robin Tadross
Production – The Y's, Mike Elizondo (co-producer)
Vocal recording – Paul Folley
Vocal production – Leona Lewis, Justin Timberlake
Mixing – Jean-Marie Harvat
Assistant mixing – Mimi Parker
String arrangements – Larry Gold
Background vocals – Justin Timberlake (not credited in booklet)

Credits adapted from the liner notes of Echo.

References

2000s ballads
2009 songs
Leona Lewis songs
Songs written by Leona Lewis
Songs written by Mike Elizondo
Songs written by James Fauntleroy
Songs written by Justin Timberlake
Songs written by Rob Knox (producer)